The dusky antbird or tyrannine antbird (Cercomacroides tyrannina) is a passerine bird in the antbird family. It is a resident breeder in tropical Central and South America from southeastern Mexico southwards to western Ecuador, and Amazonian Brazil.

Taxonomy
The dusky antbird was described by the English zoologist Philip Sclater in 1855 and given the binomial name Pyriglena tyrannina. The species was subsequently placed in the genus Cercomacra but a molecular phylogenetic study published in 2014 found that Cercomacra, as then defined, was polyphyletic. The genus was split to create two monophyletic genera and six species including the dusky antbird were moved to the newly erected genus Cercomacroides.

Habitat
This is a common bird in the understory thickets of wet forest, especially at edges and clearings, and in adjacent tall second growth. The female lays two reddish-brown-spotted white eggs, which are incubated by both sexes, in a small, deep, plant fibre and dead leaf cup nest, which is suspended from the fork of a thin branch or vine low in a tree. The male and female parents both feed the chicks.
 
The dusky antbird is typically 14.5 cm long, and weighs 18 g. The adult male is mainly blackish-grey above and paler grey below, with two white wing bars. The female has brown upperparts and rufous-cinnamon underparts. Young birds, especially males, are darker than the adults. Exact plumage shades vary geographically, since there are a number of subspecies of this antbird.

This species has a whistled kick call, and the song is a duet, the male's ascending whistle pu pu pe pi pi answered by the female's softer, jerky juu-ut juu-ut juu-ut juu-ut juu-ut .

The dusky antbird is normally found as pairs throughout the year and does not join  mixed-species feeding flocks. It feeds on insects and other arthropods taken from twigs and foliage in thickets or vine tangles.  It is easier to hear than see in its dense habitat.

References

Further reading

dusky antbird
Birds of Central America
Birds of Colombia
Birds of Venezuela
Birds of the Tumbes-Chocó-Magdalena
Birds of the Guianas
Birds of the Amazon Basin
dusky antbird
dusky antbird